The 1993 Patriot League men's basketball tournament was played at Davis Gym in Lewisburg, Pennsylvania after the conclusion of the 1992–93 regular season. Number two seed Holy Cross defeated top seed , 98–73 in the championship game, to win its first Patriot League Tournament title. The Crusaders earned an automatic bid to the 1993 NCAA tournament as #13 seed in the East region.

Format
All eight league members participated in the tournament, with teams seeded according to regular season conference record. Play began with the quarterfinal round.

Bracket

* denotes overtime period

References

Tournament
Patriot League men's basketball tournament
Patriot League men's basketball tournament
Patriot League men's basketball tournament